Melveen Leed (born on Molokai island in 1943, Hawaii) is an American singer. She graduated from Radford High School in Honolulu. After winning the title of "Miss Molokai" she began singing in the mid-1960s and has released a number of records in the genres of Hawaiian, country, and jazz music.

She won the Na Hoku Hanohano Award for Best Female Vocalist in 1978, 1979, 1981, 1984 and 1987. She has had several guest roles on Hawaii Five-O and sang at the Grand Ole Opry. She has performed in Hawaii, Las Vegas, Japan and on the west coast of California.

She has been the anchor performer at the International Marketplace in Waikiki every Saturday from 2011 until the Marketplaces's closing in December, 2014. She is scheduled to perform at Carnegie Hall, NYC on Thursday, May 29, 2014.

Recordings
 Best of Melveen, Vol. II
 Grand Old Hawaiian Music, Nashville Style
 Hawaiian Country Girl
 I Love You, Hawai'i
 Melveen's Hawaiian Country Hits, Vols. I and II
 My Isle of Golden Dreams
 A Part of Me, A Part of You
 Sur Cette Plage
 With the Best of Slack Key

She also recorded these albums with a group "The Local Divas", consisting of her, Carole Kai, Loyal Garner and Nohelani Cypriano:
 Local Diva's Christmas
 Timeless

External links
 Melveen Leed's official website
 Generations Hawaii
 Surfside Hawaii
 Hoku's
 Tidal Wave Entertainment
 "Loyal Divas" Honolulu Star-Bulletin, November 27, 2001

1943 births
Living people
Musicians from Hawaii
People from Molokai
Mountain Apple Company artists
Na Hoku Hanohano Award winners
Admiral Arthur W. Radford High School alumni